Nduka Charles Usim (born 23 March 1985) is a retired Nigeria-born naturalized Azerbaijani footballer who played as a defender, most notably for AZAL in the Azerbaijan Premier League.

Career

Club
Nduka began to play football in Nigeria for the youth teams. In 2004, he went on a trial for AZAL PFC and signed a one-year contract. For the next season he renewed his contract and made his debut in Azerbaijan Premier League. Since then Nduka plays for AZAL PFC becoming most capping player with more than 200 games.

In July 2013, after 208 games for AZAL, Usim moved to TFF First League side Tavşanlı Linyitspor on a one-year contract. After only six-months in Turkey, Usim signed a six-month contract with Simurq on 25 January 2014.

International
In early 2007, Usim was called up to the Azerbaijan U21
Usim was called for Azerbaijan national football team for the games versus Finland and Belgium in UEFA Euro 2008 qualifying Group A. He also played during the 2010 World Cup qualifier matches.

After football
Following his retirement from football, Usim ran a construction business in Nigeria

He is also a Registered Intermediary of the Nigerian Football Federation.

Career statistics

Club

International

Statistics accurate as of 6 August 2014

References

External links 

1985 births
Living people
Nigerian footballers
Igbo sportspeople
Sportspeople from Lagos
Naturalized citizens of Azerbaijan
Nigerian emigrants to Azerbaijan
Azerbaijani footballers
Azerbaijan international footballers
Azerbaijani expatriate footballers
Expatriate footballers in Turkey
Azerbaijani expatriate sportspeople in Turkey
AZAL PFK players
Azerbaijan Premier League players
TFF First League players
University of Nigeria alumni
Association football defenders
Nigerian expatriate sportspeople in Azerbaijan